The false-eye seahorse, or flatface seahorse (Hippocampus planifrons) is a species of marine fish of the family Syngnathidae. It is endemic to Australia, from Shark Bay to Broome, where it is found in intertidal rockpools, shallow algae and weedy or rubble reef habitats. It is expected to feed on harpacticoid, calanoid, and cyclopoid copepods, caridean and gammaridean shrimps, and mysids, similar to other seahorses. This species is ovoviviparous, with males brooding eggs in a brood pouch before giving birth to live young.

Identifying features

It is characterized by a relatively small head, short and upturned snout, slender trunk, slightly raised coronet, and spines. Female colouration in life is overall greenish brown with dark blotching over the back of the trunk and tail.

References

Further reading
iSeahorse

planifrons
Fish described in 1877
Marine fish
Taxonomy articles created by Polbot